Steinunn Sæmundsdóttir (born 28 November 1960) is a former Icelandic female alpine skier. She competed at the 1976 as well as in the 1980 Winter Olympics representing Iceland.

References 

1960 births
Living people
Steinunn Saemundsdottir
Alpine skiers at the 1976 Winter Olympics
Alpine skiers at the 1980 Winter Olympics
Steinunn Saemundsdottir
20th-century Icelandic women